Josignacio (b. José Ignacio Sánchez-Rius, in Havana, Cuba, on October 24, 1963) is a Cuban artist, who first emerged in the controversial, "La Generacion de los 80s." The 80s generation of contemporary Cuban art  also referred to as New Cuban Art.

This cultural decade in Cuba contrasted a country in transition, that influenced artistic debates both at home and abroad, began their collaboration with “Volume 1"   - a commitment to non-government mandated artistic expression. They included Rubén Torres Llorca, José Bedia Valdés, Ricardo Rodriguez Brey, Juan Francisco Elso, Rogelio López Marín (Gory), Gustavo Pérez Monzón, José Manuel Fors, Leandro Soto Ortiz, Israel León, Tomás Sánchez and Carlos Alfonzo.

In the second half of the decade, other artistic groups were formed, including 4 x 4, Grupo Hexágono, Arte Calle, Grupo Provisional, the duet René Francisco Rodríguez and Eduardo Ponjuán González   and ABTV. Grupo Puré, another new wave of young artists, graduates of the Instituto Superior de Arte (ISA). included Ana Albertina Delgado Álvarez, Adriano Buergo, Ciro Quintana.

In 1984, Josignacio created "Plastic Paint Medium" by mixing epoxy resins with oil colors and other pigments, resulting in a hard, shiny, 3D finish, his identifiable style.

Biography

In 1984, he was commissioned to work as a painting assistant to Martinez Anay and Andres Ugalde to paint a mural for the Sociedad de Educación Patriótico-Militar (SEPMI) (the Military Patriotic Educational Society), the Cuban version of the Boy Scouts.

In 1988, Josignacio, a member of the "Asociación Hermanos Saíz", was commissioned by their directives to design a float for the Havana Carnival 1988. As soon as he finished the design, he presented it to the commission. They cancelled his participation arguing that they needed to give the float design to another Cuban painter, Manuel Mendive. The reason was that in Miami, one of Mendive's paintings titled El Pavo Real had been burned  by an anti-Castro militant.

On May 10, 1989, with no explanation, all of Josignacio's planned shows at Auditorio Nacional, (National Auditorium), and Los Talleres de Coyoacán, Mexico City were cancelled by orders of the Cuban embassy in Mexico City.

Influences
After 1960, Cuban abstract art was scarce or considerably silenced. The group coalesced around Galería Color-Luz, which was started just after Ms. Soldevilla returned from several years in Paris as Cuba's cultural attaché. Her partner in the effort, Pedro de Oraá, an artist, poet and art critic, born in 1931, wrote a short history of the group.

Josignacio was influenced by the abstract expressionists of the New York School (art), especially Jackson Pollock, from whom he originally saw the use of dripping and pouring paint onto canvases. However, instead of alkyd enamels that Pollack used, Josignacio used his "Plastic Paint Medium" technique of mixing epoxy resins with oil colors and other pigments. Dutch painter Karel Appel's faces and Russian artist Wassily Kandinsky's mix of colors  were also special focuses. From Dutch-American Willem de Kooning, Josignacio learned the centered figure compositions

Social causes and charity work

Josignacio contributed to social causes by donating his artworks. Since 1996, Josignacio has been a fundraiser for the Miami Children's Hospital. He has also worked on behalf of earthquake victims and hurricane victims. In 2017, a portion of the proceeds from the sale of his painting Smooth Guitar was donated to aid those affected by Hurricane Irma.

Art in public places

In 2011, Josignacio produced a 8 foot x 12 foot mural titled Tree of Life in Asbury Park, New Jersey. This triptych represents a convergence of the past, present and future, to create an image of humanity, and is dedicated to the children of Asbury Park. Tree of Life is permanently located at the Asbury Park Transportation Center on Main Street in Asbury Park, New Jersey.

Awards

1996 - Awarded the Best in Show Prize at Hortt 38 jury art show exhibition at the Museum of Art Fort Lauderdale in Florida.

Auction records

On December 15, 2015, Josignacio's The Key of Success (2011), sold for a hammer price of $574,750 USD at Miami Auction Gallery, Miami, Florida.
 
The following spring, on March 10, 2016, Josignacio's The Music is Timeless (1989), depicting one of his legendary Guitars, sold for a hammer price of $3,481,205.00 USD at McCarthy-Williams Auctions in London.

On July 7, 2016, Josignacio's Rosto (1989), sold for a hammer price of $2,329,200.00 USD at McCarthy-Williams Auctions, London.

Exhibitions
 1997 - "Liquid Sex" at Liquid Night Club organized by Ingrid Casares and Chris Paciello, Miami, Florida.
 2001 - Cuba Nostalgia Alfredo Martínez Gallery. “The cuban Vanguardia and Contemporary Art” Along with Josignacio, René Portocarrero, Amelia Peláez Carlos Enríquez Gómez, Fidelio Ponce de León, Mario Carreño Morales, José Mijares (artist), Cundo Bermúdez, Rafael Soriano, Víctor Manuel García Valdéz and Wifredo Lam
 2002 - Cuba Nostalgia Alfredo Martínez Gallery. “The Contemporary” A group show with Jesse de los Rios, Clara Morera, Nelson Franco, Juan Navarrete, Marvin Chinchilla, Ulrich Gehret, Ana María Sarlat, Lia Galletti, Carlos Alfonzo, Lesver de Quiros, Arcadio Cancio, Andrés Valerio, Enrique Gay García, Héctor Molné, José María Mijares and Agustín Gainza
 2009 - New Jersey's Art629 Gallery "Art Series’ Presents: Contemporary Cuban Artist Josignacio". A Prevention First's charitable event for the children of Asbury Park.
 2010 - "Josignacio: The Master of Colors" exhibition previewing the artworks appearing in the documentary of the same title at the Surf Club in Surfside, Florida.
 2015 - "Cuban Art Revolution" at Macaya Gallery, Wynwood Art District.
 2016 - "China and its Popular Culture" at the Culture Pavilion of the Expocuba which was dedicated to celebrate the 169th anniversary of the arrival of Chinese people to Cuba. Notably, this was the first exhibition of Josignacio in Cuba after working in the US for more than 26 years. The exhibition depicted the 12 signs of the Chinese Zodiac. Additionally, there was an interpretation of the fenghuang, a koi fish, a butterfly, and a panda bear. The opening words of the exhibition were held by the Ambassador of the People's Republic of China in Havana, Cuba, Mr. Zhang Tuo.
 2016 - "De Douceur Á Intense"  was personally commissioned for the 25th Anniversary of the International Ballet Festival of Havana [58] in October 2016, by the historically revered prima ballerina assoluta and founder of the Cuban National Ballet, Alicia Alonso. This twenty-one painting exhibition from Josignacio's "Dance Series" captured both dramatic and poignant moments from the most relevant classical ballets, including Swan Lake, Giselle, Don Quixote and Carmen. The exhibition was held in "La Sala Ernesto Lecuona," at the Gran Teatro de La Habana, Cuba.  
 2017 - The exhibition titled "El Renacer del Ave Fénix" (The Reborn of Phoenix) to celebrate the new Chinese year 2017 "Fire Rooster" (28 January -15 February 2018) Commissioned by its director Dr. Teresa Li, this Josignacio exhibition was held in Casa de las Artes y Tradiciones Chinas (House of Arts and Chinese Traditions), in the heart of Havana's Chinatown. The opening words of the exhibition were given by Mr. Chen Xi [66], the new Ambassador of the People's Republic of China and ethnologist and author, Dr. Natalia Bolívar. Cuban government representatives were also present at the opening. The key artwork of this exhibition, Fenix, a part of Josignacio's "Signs Series," was acquired by Casa de las Artes y Tradiciones Chinas (House of Arts and Chinese Traditions), Havana, Cuba, for public display in its permanent collection.
 2017 - The most emblematic and iconic place in Havana is La Bodeguita del Medio founded in 1942. For its 75th Anniversary as part of the festivities to commemorate this event, an acquisition of Josignacio's work titled Mojito, a semi-figurative painting depicting this traditional drink, was included and is now on permanent display.
 2017 – "Siete Adagios para Safo y Ganimedes" ("Seven Adagios for Sappho and Ganymede") Despite the controversy of homosexuality's delicate theme in communist Cuba, a collection of Josignacio's seven neo-figurative large format Guitars, curated by journalist and writer, Yoel Almaguer de Armas and Lic. in Art History, Diana Rosa Crespo, was exhibited in the Karl Marx Theatre. Along with Josignacio's signature forms and colors, the selection was specifically chosen to represent the seven colors of the rainbow, symbolic of the colors of the LGBTQ (Lesbian, Gay, Bisexual, Transgender and Queer) flag, which characterizes the world LGBTQ movement. The Rainbow Flag, also known as the LGBTQ flag, has represented gay and lesbian communities since the late 1970s. The flag was designed by artist Gilbert Baker and popularized in 1978. These artworks are part of Josignacio's extensive series of Guitars called “Rainbow Guitars.” He did this exhibition in support of equal rights and the acceptance of those discriminated against in his native homeland. Bravely led by Mariela Castro Espin, the daughter of Raúl Modesto Castro Ruz, First Secretary of the Communist Party of Cuba and the actual leader of Cuba, Mariela currently heads the Cuban National Center for Sex Education (CENESEX), proof of the Cuban government's intention to open up human rights issues. The reason for Josignacio's exhibition title "Seven Adagios for Sappho and Ganymede" is that the musical term adagio indicates that music is to be played slowly, reminding us of the same slow process of LGBTQ acceptance and its two primary characters. The real Sappho of Mytilene, also known as Sappho of Lesbos, was a Greek poet who has historically been identified by many as the symbol of female homosexuality. The mythological Ganymede became the lover of the God Zeus.
 2017 - "China a Puro Color" (“China Pure Color” at Expo Cuba 2017 (Arts Pavilion). This exhibition showcased Josignacio's eight big format abstract paintings depicting the typical colors of China's culture and folklore to celebrate the 170th anniversary of the presence of the Chinese people in Cuba. It was organized by Ministerio de Cultura de la República de Cuba (Ministry of Culture of the People's Republic of China, Oficina del Historiador de la Habana, and Instituto Cubano de Amistad con los Pueblos ICAP).
 2017 - “Punto y Línea sobre el plano” a group art exhibition in Fábrica de Arte Cubano (FAC) including Antoine Mena, Donis Llago, Gabriel Sanches Toledo, Jorge Gody, Josignacio, Nelson Villalobo Ferrer, Onay Rosquet, Osy Milián, Víctor M. Gómez and curated by FAC head's curator Rosemary Rodríguez.
 2017- "Fuente del Otro" Exhibition at Galería René Portocarrero National Theatre of Cuba, 29 contemporary artists among them: Pedro de Oraa, Carlos Trillo Name, Ruben Rodriguez, Dionisio Abad Jarrosay Ruiz, Jose Fowler, Rogelio Rodriguez Cobas, Angel Rivero Sierra, Wilay Méndez Páez, Ramón Víctor Casas Viera and Santiago Luis Ferrer – Kender as a homage to Cuban master René Portocarrero.
 2017- "National Encounter of Abstract Art" at "René Portocarrero" Gallery of the National Theater of Cuba/Encuentro Nacional de Arte Abstracto. Galería “René Portocarrero” del Teatro Nacional de Cuba from October 8 to November 8, show curated by Author Lic. Luis García Peraza and catalogue's words made by renowned Cuban abstract painter Pedro de Oraá, the show included twenty-nine abstract artists.
 2017- “Martí visto por Josignacio” “Martí seen by Josignacio” A selection of twenty eight artworks in a Solo show (art exhibition) made by the artist inspired by the life, figure and writing works such as Simple Verses, of Cuban's National Hero, poet José Martí, through more than thirty year's career in the Biblioteca Nacional de Cuba José Martí gallery El Reino de Este Mundo in collaboration with Consejo Nacional de Artes Plasticas. The opening date for this show was chosen October 18 to celebrate 116 anniversary of the library's, which was established on October 18, 1901.

Additional exhibitions

From 1987 to 1989 Josignacio had his artwork displayed in Havana at the following galleries for exhibition:

Galeria del Palacio del Segundo Cabo
Galeria del teatro Mella
"Moda en rojos" La Maison Fashion house
Galeria del Fondo Cubano de Vienes Culturales
Galeria del Café Teatro Brecht
1989 "Comparzas y Carnavales" La Maison
Exhibición en el lobby del Hotel Habana Libre "Abstracts"
Exhibición en el lobby del Hotel Internacional de Varadero
Since 1989, and his arrival to Miami art scene, art historian and former Miami Herald art critic Helen Kohen wrote about Josignacio's dedication to help raise money for AIDS patients of Genesis Project. These auctions, held at InterContinental Hotel Miami, were presided by Julio Hernandez Rojo and Dolores C. Smithies. Numerous group exhibitions at the Cuban Museum of Arts and Culture and several Miami art galleries followed.
1999 “Fiesta Cubana” Alfredo Martínez Gallery. Curated by Armando Álvarez Bravo

Writings and essays

 2016 - "Delirium" by Lic. in Art History and Journalist Eliset García Deulofeu
 2016 - "Plastic Paint Medium: una revolución tecno-pictórica creada en Cuba" by Lic. in Art History, Journalist and writer Yoel Almaguer de Armas
 2017 - "Josignacio y la boca abierta"
 2017 - "Siete guitarras contra la homofobia y la transfobia" by Lic. in Art History, Journalist and writer Yoel Almaguer de Armas and Lic. in Art History Diana Rosa Crespo
 2017 - "El Martí de Josignacio"
 2017 - An extraordinary artistic product "Un extraordinario producto artístico" by Nathalie Sánchez. Published November 6, 2017 Tribuna de La Habana
 2017 - "Martí visto por Josignacio". 
 2017 - "Visiones de Martí" 
 2017 - "Martí visto por Josignacio en el alma del arte que acrisola y enaltece"
 2018 - "La identidad de un creador" by Nathalie Mesa
 2018 - “El Martiano Josignacio”
 2018 - "Martí vs Dos Ríos" Painting of Josignacio selected to illustrate the cover an back cover of the Volume 1 (2018) of the National Library of Cuba's magazine

Gallery

References

 Las Oleadas de resina de Josignacio Culturales by Toni Piñera, Granma newspaper La Habana 4 de Marzo de 1987. Cuba
 Josignacio Plastica by Ele Nussa. Revista Bohemia Marzo 27 de 1987. Cuba
 Exposicion del Joven Pintor Josignacio 17 de septiembre de 1987 Trabajadores newspaper Cuba
 Josignacio Novato del año Plastica by Ele Nussa. Revista Bohemia Septiembre 18 de 1987. Cuba
 Josignacio esta acabando, Los Pasos de un Joven Diligente Plastica by Ele Nussa. Revista Bohemia Abril de 1988. Cuba
 Contacto Dedicated to artist Josignacio by Hilda Rabilero, Cubavision International, Canal 6, 1987. Cuba1988
 Concierto Sentido Dedicated to artist Josignacio and Cuban musician José María Vitier, Cubavision International, Canal 6, 1988. Cuba
 "Revista de la Mañana" "Josignacio nos habla de su novedosa tecnica" an interview by Freddy Moros, Dedicate to Artist Josignacio. Cubavision International, Canal 6, 1988. Cuba
 Josignacio Creador de una novedosa tecnica pictorica by Dinorah del Real "Panorama" Cubavision International, Canal 6, 1988. Cuba
 Josignacio Nuestro Orgullo by Esteban Lamelas, Univision Channel 23, 1996
 Helen Kohen, Two Events Offer Chance to Buy artworks, Fight AIDS Auction, Miami, Florida, The Miami Herald newspaper, April 20, 1990
 Alvarez-Bravo, Armando, De Ronda, Miami, Florida, El Nuevo Herald newspaper, September 4, 1996.
 Alvarez-Bravo, Armando, Josignacio, Miami, Florida, El Nuevo Herald newspaper, July 20, 1996.
 Into the Night by Liz Martinez. Miami New Times, May 15, 1997http://www.miaminewtimes.com/music/into-the-night-6360742
 Cover Illustration for the book Oduduwa Un Secreto de Ifa. by Claudia Mola Fernandez . 1999
 Emilio Ichikawa Josignacio: un pintor abstracto en Miami, Miami, Florida, El Nuevo Herald newspaper, August 11, 2008.

1963 births
Living people
Cuban contemporary artists
Artists from Havana
20th-century Cuban painters
20th-century Cuban male artists
21st-century Cuban painters
21st-century male artists
Male painters